Gavin Campbell may refer to:

 Gavin Campbell, 1st Marquess of Breadalbane (1851–1922), Scottish nobleman and Liberal politician
 Gavin Campbell, lead guitarist with Australian rock band 67 Special
 Gavin Campbell (music producer), Australian DJ and remixer
 Gavin Campbell (presenter) (born 1946), businessman and former television presenter

Fictional characters
 Gavin Campbell (Home and Away), fictional character on the Australian soap opera Home and Away